The Department of Labour and Employment of state of Tamil Nadu is one of the Department of Government of Tamil Nadu

History 
 The Department of Labour and Employment  was formed in 1972, when Government of Tamil Nadu trifurcated the Industries, Labour and Housing Department at Tamil Nadu new Legislature & Secretariat Complex  Secretariat.

Objective & Functions of the Department 
The Department of Labour and Employment  is administering matters relating to Industrial relations, Safety of workers, Labour Welfare, Employment Exchanges and Technical training.  The  Commissioner of Labour looks after Industrial Relations and Labour Welfare.  The Chief Inspector of Factories deals with safety in Factories.  The Commissioner of Employment & Training heads two wings.  The Employment Wing deals with Employment Services through a network of Employment Exchanges.  The Training Wing deals with technical training through a number of Industrial Training Institutes and similar institutions.  Social security is provided in a large measure, by two Central Organisations viz.  The Employees Provident Fund Organisation and the Employees State Insurance Corporation.  the State Labour Welfare Board provides welfare 
services to workers in the organized sector.  The Tamil Nadu Construction Workers Welfare Board, and the Tamil Nadu Manual Workers Social Security and Welfare Board provide Welfare Services to workers in the unorganized sector.  The Tamil Nadu Institute of Labour Studies conducts courses in Labour Management and  special courses for managements, workers and officials on labour laws.  The Overseas Manpower Corporation helps to find placements for workers willing to work overseas.  Abolition of Child Labour  is an important goal of the State Government.

Works 
According to the allocation of subjects as per the Business Rules, this Department has been allocated the following items of work:
 State Subjects:
 Criminal Appeals 
 Public Services – Statutory Rules  of the Services with which the Department is concerned – Revision of and amendment to those rules. 
 Relief of the unemployed. 
 Sanction of prosecution of Government Servants
 Concurrent Subjects:

 All India Labour Ministers’ Conference, Standing Labour Committee. 
 Indian Labour Conference, National Commission on Labour. 
 Code of Labour discipline and grievance – procedure. 
 Craftsmen Training, Apprenticeship Training. 
 Factories. 
 Fair Price Shops for Industrial Workers – Industrial Labour. 
 Fatal Accidents Act, 1855 
 Industrial and Labour Disputes. 
 Labour Courts and Industrial Tribunals. 
 Social Security and Social Insurance. 
 The Tamil Nadu Labour Journal – labour – Law Journal. 
 The Workers Education Scheme, Workers Participation in Management and Productivity. 
 Vocational and Technical Training. 
 Welfare of Labour including conditions of work, employers liability, invalidity and old age pensions and maternity benefits, bonus. Wage Boards. 
 Employment and Unemployment. 
 The Beedi and Cigar Workers (Conditions and Employment) Act, 1966. 
 The Contract Labour (Regulation and Abolition) Act, 1970 
 The Employees’ Provident Funds and Miscellaneous Provisions Act, 1952. 
 The Employees’ State Insurance Act, 1948. 
 The Employment Exchanges (Compulsory Notification of vacancies) Act, 1959. 
 The Child Labour (Prohibition and Regulation) Act, 1986. 
 The Trade Unions Act, 1926. 
 The Industrial Disputes Act, 1947. 
 The Industrial Establishments (Standing Orders) Act, 1946. 
 The Maternity Benefits Act, 1961. 
 The Motor Transport Workers Act, 1961. 
 The Apprentices Act, 1961. 
 The Factories Act, 1948. 
 The Minimum Wages Act, 1948. 
 The Payment of Bonus Act, 1965. 
 The Payment of Gratuity Act, 1972. 
 The Payment of Wages Act, 1936. 
 The Plantations Labour Act, 1951. 
 The Workmen’s Compensation Act, 1933. 
 The Working Journalists and other Newspaper Employees (Conditions of service and Miscellaneous Provisions) Act, 1955. 
 The Standards of Weights and Measures (Enforcement) Act, 1985. 
 The Tamil Nadu Catering Establishment Act, 1958. 
 The Tamil Nadu Industrial Establishments (National and Festival Holidays) Act, 1958. 
 The Tamil Nadu Shops and Establishments Act, 1947. 
 The Tamil Nadu Labour Welfare Fund Act, 1972

 Union Subjects:
 Civil Pioneer  Force and Civil Labour Units. 
 Establishment of Standards of Weights and Measures. 
 International Labour Organisation. 
 The Tea Districts Emigrant Labour  Act.

Sub - Departments

Undertakings & Bodies

Present Ministers for Labour and Employment 
 [C.v.ganesan]

Former Ministers for Labour and Employment 
 2006 - 2011:
 T. M. Anbarasan
 2013 - 2016 
 K. T. Pachaimal

See also 
 Government of Tamil Nadu
 Tamil Nadu Government's Departments
 Ministry of Labour and Employment (India)
 Department of Finance (Kerala)

External links
 https://archive.today/20121218224931/http://www.tn.gov.in/departments/labour.html (Official Website of the  Labour and Employment Department, Tamil Nadu)
 http://www.tn.gov.in (Official website of Government of Tamil Nadu)

References

Tamil Nadu state government departments
Labour relations in India
1972 establishments in Tamil Nadu
Tamil Nadu